RU-2309, also known as 18-methylmetribolone, δ9,11-17α,18-dimethyl-19-nortestosterone, or 17α,18-dimethylestr-4,9,11-trien-17β-ol-3-one, is a 17α-alkylated androgen/anabolic steroid (AAS) of the 19-nortestosterone group which was never marketed. It is the C18 methyl or C13β ethyl derivative of metribolone. The compound is closely related to tetrahydrogestrinone (THG), which has the same chemical structure as RU-2309 except for possessing an ethyl group at the C17α position instead of a methyl group. Hence, it could also be referred to as 17α-methyl-THG. RU-2309 shows high affinity for the androgen, progesterone, and glucocorticoid receptors.

See also
 List of androgens/anabolic steroids

References

Tertiary alcohols
Androgens and anabolic steroids
Estranes
Glucocorticoids
Hepatotoxins
Ketones
Progestogens